Chhokar Kalan is a small village in Gujrat District tehsil Kharian in the state of Punjab, Pakistan. It is situated 30 kilometers from Gujrat Railway Station. Village belongs to mostly Gujjar families, settled in Europe and Middle East countries.  The majority of the residents are farmers. Castes include Kundoawana, Poswal, and Kalas Gujjar.  

Prior to 1947, a few Hindu Khatri families resided in the village; however, after the partition they migrated to India. Gujjar families dominated most of the village and continue to do so.  

Nearby places include Lalamusa, Dinga City and Mirpur.

References

Villages in Gujrat District
Populated places in Gujrat District